House of Silence is the seventh studio album by German band Bad Boys Blue. It was released on 14 October 1991 by Coconut Records. John McInerney performed all the songs. The record includes one single—"House Of Silence". The album was certified gold in Finland in 1991.

Track listing
"House of Silence" – 3:54   
"Under the Boardwalk" – 3:32
"Train at Midnight" – 3:29   
"Baby Blue" – 3:46   
"Dancing With The Bad Boys" – 4:17   
"Deep In My Emotion" – 3:43   
"Tell It Everybody" – 3:18   
"Gimme Back My Love" – 4:00   
"When Our Love Was Young" – 3:43   
"House of Silence (Haunted House Mix)" – 4:08

Personnel
Bad Boys Blue
John McInerney – lead vocal (all tracks)
Andrew Thomas – rap parts (5, 7)
Trevor Bannister

Additional personnel
Lyrics By – A. Thomas (tracks: 5, 7), J. McInerney (tracks: 7), K. van Haaren (tracks: 1, 3 to 10)
Music By – K. van Haaren (tracks: 5, 7), T. Hendrik (tracks: 1, 3 to 10)
Photography By – Florian Seidel
Producer – Tony Hendrik and Karin Hartmann  
Recorded By, Mixed By – Gary Jones

Credits
All tracks written by T. Hendrik/K.van Haaren except 2 written by Young/Resnick
5,7 written by T. Hendrik, K.van Haaren/K.van Haaren, A. Thomas
8 written by T. Hendrik/K.van Haaren, J. McInerney
Keyboards by Uwe Haselsteiner and Peter Schmitz
Guitars by John Parsons
Produced by Tony Hendrik & Karin Hartmann
Recorded and mixed by Gary Jones at Coconut Studio, Hennef, Germany

Sales and certifications

References

External links
ALBUM - House Of Silence
Bad Boys Blue – General Information

1991 albums
Bad Boys Blue albums